Gwacheon Station is a station on the Seoul Subway Line 4. Despite its name, it is not the principal train station serving the city of Gwacheon; the next station on Line 4 is.

Station layout

References

Seoul Metropolitan Subway stations
Railway stations opened in 1994
Metro stations in Gwacheon